Tocaland is a historic plantation house located on S.C. Route 344 near Winnsboro, Fairfield County, South Carolina.  It was built about 1854, and is a -story, weatherboarded frame Greek revival style dwelling on a raised basement.  The front facade features four 8-foot high stuccoed granite piers that support a pedimented front porch. The porch is supported by four paneled wooden pillars, pilasters, and has a plain balustrade.

It was added to the National Register of Historic Places in 1984.

References

Further reading
Julian Stevenson Bolick, A Fairfield Sketchbook, pp 56, 58

External links
 South Carolina Plantations
 Historic Place Database
 

Plantation houses in South Carolina
Historic American Buildings Survey in South Carolina
Houses on the National Register of Historic Places in South Carolina
Greek Revival houses in South Carolina
Houses completed in 1854
Houses in Fairfield County, South Carolina
National Register of Historic Places in Fairfield County, South Carolina